Johann Kaspar Füssli, also written Johann Caspar Fuesslins or Fuessly (9 March 1743 – 4 May 1786), was a Swiss painter, entomologist and publisher.

He was born in Zurich, the son of Johann Caspar Füssli (1706–1782) and Anna Elisabeth Waser.  He was thus the brother of Henry Fuseli (Johann Heinrich Füssli, 1745–1825).
He married twice: to Verena Störi in 1770, and Anna Elisabeth Kilchsperger in 1774.

The only spider species he described (as Fuesslin, 1775) is the "daddy long-legs spider", Pholcus phalangioides, also known as "cellar spider".

He died, aged 43, in Winterthur.

Publications 
 Verzeichnis der ihm bekannten Schweitzerischen Inseckten (1775)
  Magazin für die Liebhaber der Entomologie two tomes (1778–79)
 Neue Magazin für Liebhaber der Entomologie (1781–86).

References

External links
 
  BHL Scan of Verzeichniss der ihm bekannten Schweizerischen Inseckten : mit einer augemahlten Kupfertafel: nebst der Ankhundigung eines neuen Insecten Werks  Joh. Caspar Fuesslins 1775.

Swiss entomologists
18th-century Swiss painters
18th-century Swiss male artists
Swiss male painters
1743 births
1786 deaths
Artists from Zürich
Johann Kaspar